Thomas Martin (May 21, 1850 – March 12, 1907) was a Canadian politician.

Born in Fergus, Canada West, the son of John Martin and Jean Munro, both of Scotland, Martin educated at Mount Forest, Ontario. A miller by profession, he was a Councillor and Mayor of Mount Forest. He was elected to the House of Commons of Canada for the riding of Wellington North in 1904 federal election. A Liberal, he died in office in 1907. His brother, Alexander Munro Martin, was elected to the same riding in the resulting by-election.

References
 The Canadian Parliament; biographical sketches and photo-engravures of the senators and members of the House of Commons of Canada. Being the tenth Parliament, elected November 3, 1904

External links
 

1850 births
1907 deaths
Liberal Party of Canada MPs
Mayors of places in Ontario
Members of the House of Commons of Canada from Ontario
People from Centre Wellington
Canadian people of Scottish descent